"A las Barricadas" ("To the Barricades") was one of the most popular songs of the Spanish anarchists during the Spanish Civil War. "A las Barricadas" is sung to the tune of "Whirlwinds of Danger" ("Warszawianka"), composed by Józef Pławiński. The lyrics written by Valeriano Orobón Fernández in 1936 were partly based on the original Polish lyrics by Wacław Święcicki.

"The Confederation" referred to in the final stanza is the anarcho-syndicalist CNT ( — "National Confederation of Labor"), which at the time was the largest labour union, the main anarchist organisation in Spain, and from 1936 to 1939 were a major force opposing Francisco Franco's military coup against the Spanish Republic.

Lyrics

Covering artists 

 Bandista (with the name "Haydi Barikata")
 Jean-Marc Leclercq
 Pascal Comelade
 Victor Manuel and Ana Belén (as a duet piece).
 Los Muertos de Cristo
 Feminazgûl

See also
Songs of the Spanish Civil War

References

External links
 Score 
 Himno de la CNT – Hosting mp3s of "A Las Barricadas"
 http://anarchismus.at/ – Hosting mp3s of "A Las Barricadas"

Songs about revolutions
1936 songs
Confederación Nacional del Trabajo
History of anarchism
Spanish-language songs
Barricades
Anarchism in Spain
Barricades
Anti-fascist music